Lalpur may refer to:
 Lalpur Chowk, a residential area in Ranchi, India
Lalpur, Ranchi
 Lalpur, Agra, Uttar Pradesh, India
 Lalpur Upazila, Bangladesh
Lalpur, Lumbini, Nepal
Lalpur, Sagarmatha, Nepal
 Lalpur, Kanpur Dehat district
Lalpur, Jamnagar district, Gujarat, India
Lalpur (Rewari) is a village in Rewari district near Bariawas
Lalpur (jhunjhunu) is a village in jhunjhunu near bagar
Lalpur, Mathurapur, a census town in South 24 Parganas district, West Bengal, India
Lalpur, Nadia, a census town in Nadia district, West Bengal, India
Lalpur,Tarn Taran District, India
Lalpur, Khiron, a village in Raebareli district, Uttar Pradesh, India